Keum Ji-hyeon (born 17 March 2000) is a South Korean sport shooter.

She participated at the 2018 ISSF World Shooting Championships.

References

External links

Living people
2000 births
South Korean female sport shooters
ISSF rifle shooters
Shooters at the 2018 Asian Games
Asian Games competitors for South Korea
21st-century South Korean women